Golden Crest Records was an American music label. In its original incarnation it produced records from 1956 until 1983 and was headed by Clark Galehouse. It was a subsidiary of Shelley Products in Huntington Station. The label released The Fabulous Wailers instrumental hit "Tall Cool One". Ace Records released a Best of Golden Crest album. The label's collection is in the Library of Congress.

Discography
James F. Burke (Musician) albums
The All-Star Concert Band (Golden Crest Records, 1960)
The Burke/Phillips All-Star Concert Band (Golden Crest Records, 1961)
Mark Thomas (flutist) albums
Images (with Christine Croshaw) (Golden Crest Records, 1982)
Contrasts (with Christine Croshaw) (Golden Crest Records, 1983)
Paul Brodie albums
Wind Quintet (Schoenberg) album
Gigi (Hank Jones album)
Fisher Tull LP
Leonard Falcone album
Jack Winerock album
William Bell (tuba player) album
Scott Joplin album
John Garvey (musician) album
Coenraad Bloemendal album
Malcolm Bilson album
The Chessmen album
Billy Mure
The Montells
John Haynie (trumpet)

Further reading
Record Makers and Breakers: Voices of the Independent Rock ‘n’ Roll Pioneers by John Broven, University of Illinois Press, Urbana 2009 chapter 20 and pages 13-20
'“Not Only Rock ‘n’ Roll!: The Golden Crest Records Story" by John Broven, American Music Magazine (Sweden) No. 81, September 1999, 13

References

External links
"Golden Crest Records: The Independent Record Industry Comes to Long Island" from the Long Island History Journal

American record labels
1956 establishments in the United States
1983 disestablishments in the United States